Skizz was a comic book strip in 2000 AD which appeared in three installments across more than a decade. It was written by Alan Moore and drawn by Jim Baikie. Two sequels appeared some years later, written and drawn by Baikie.

It is best described as a cross between E.T and Boys from the Blackstuff.

Plot

Skizz, an alien interpreter, crash lands on Earth and his ship self-destructs to stop it falling into the wrong hands. He is saved from the military by a young girl called Roxy.

Bibliography

Skizz:
Skizz (in 2000 AD #308–330, 1983)
Alien Cultures (in 2000 AD #767–775, 1992)
Skizz Book 3 (in 2000 AD #912–927, 1994–1995)

There have a number of trade paperback releases over the years:

Skizz:
Titan (1989 )
Titan (2002 )
Rebellion Developments (2005 )
DC (2005 )
Skizz II: Alien Cultures:
Mandarin (1993  )

External links
2000 AD profile
Review of the 2005 collection

2000 AD comic strips
British comics
Comics about extraterrestrial life
Comics by Alan Moore